"Technical Error" is a science fiction short story by English writer Arthur C. Clarke. It was published in 1950 under the title "The Reversed Man" and appeared again in Clarke's collection of short stories Reach for Tomorrow, in 1956.

Plot summary

The first power plant to exploit superconductivity has been built, and worker Richard Nelson is "laterally inverted" following an accidental short-circuit in the facility. Nelson finds himself wearing his wedding ring on the wrong hand. Written texts appear mirror-inverted, and coins and his technical diary have been affected. Nelson begins to starve; normal food does not nourish him because most biological molecules are chiral. A chemist, Prof. Vandenburg, develops mirror-inverted parallels of nutrients required by Nelson.

Ralph Hughes, the station's chief physicist, investigates the incident. He discovers that Nelson has traveled through a fourth spatial dimension. He dismisses the arguments of his curious secretary McPherson, who suspects that Albert Einstein had found this fourth dimension - time. The board of directors induce Nelson to partake in an experiment to "re-invert" him. Moreover, nobody is sure if they could continue to meet his unique dietary requirements.

When recreating the short-circuit as closely as possible, a number of disquieting questions are raised regarding the technical parameters and specifications to meet. Subsequently, Nelson disappears during the second replicated short-circuit and, in a rush to supply power, a generator is brought in. It remains unclear what became of Nelson after his disappearance; his assistant remarked that there "didn't seem to be a person in the generator immediately after the accident".

In the early hours of the morning, Hughes realises that the additional generator was placed exactly where Nelson disappeared. This leads him to believe that Nelson must have disappeared from time, but could re-materialize in the same spot as the running generator at any moment. He does not manage to contact the power station in time, and, in the distance, above the site of the station, a giant cloud of destruction is seen rising into the sky.

See also
Chiral life concept of chemically synthesizing mirror-inverted cells
Fourth dimension in literature
"Left to Right", a short story with a similar premise by Isaac Asimov
Spock Must Die!, a novel using a similar plot device

References

Sources

External links

Short stories by Arthur C. Clarke
Works originally published in science fiction magazines
1950 short stories